Major-General Oliver McCrea Roome CBE (9 March 1921 – 8 November 2009) was a British Army officer.

He was the son of Maj. Gen. Sir Horace Roome.

References

1921 births
2009 deaths
High Sheriffs of the Isle of Wight
Commanders of the Order of the British Empire
British Army generals
Royal Engineers officers
British Army personnel of World War II